Nay Lin Tun (born 19 March 1993) is a Burmese footballer who plays as a midfielder for Ayeyawady United. He played for Myanmar U23 at the 2013 SEA Games and 2015 SEA Games. He appeared five times as captain and scored three times. 
He scored the winning goal against Vietnam at  the semifinals and sent the Myanmar U-23 team to the final of the 2015 Singapore SEA Games.

Honours

Club

Ayeyawady United
MFF Cup (2):  2012, 2014
2015 General Aung San Shield

References 

1993 births
Living people
Burmese footballers
Myanmar international footballers
Ayeyawady United F.C. players
Association football midfielders
Southeast Asian Games silver medalists for Myanmar
Southeast Asian Games medalists in football
Competitors at the 2013 Southeast Asian Games
Competitors at the 2015 Southeast Asian Games